U.S. Route 25E (US 25E) is the eastern branch of U.S. Route 25 from Newport, Tennessee, where US 25 splits into US 25E and US 25W, to North Corbin, Kentucky, where the two highways rejoin. The road, however, continues as US 25E for roughly 2 miles (3.2 km) until it joins Interstate 75 in the Laurel County community of North Corbin at exit 29. The entire route serves as a arterial expressway for long-distance travelers and truckers connecting central Appalachia to the Great Lakes and Eastern Seaboard regions of the U.S. via access to Interstate highways.

All of US 25E in Tennessee, along with US 25 from Newport to the North Carolina state line, is designated as the East Tennessee Crossing Byway, a National Scenic Byway. Portions of US 25E in Tennessee and Kentucky are designated as part of the Appalachian Development Highway System, which include Corridor S and Corridor F. Corridor S follows US 25E between I-81 in Morristown to SR 63 (Corridor F) in Harrogate, and Corridor F follows the route from SR 63 to U.S. Route 119 in Pineville.

Since 1982, US 25E from exit 29 of I-75 in North Corbin to exit 8 of I-81 in Morristown has been established as a federal truck route in the National Truck Network. This same stretch of US 25E has been recognized as High-Priority Corridor 12, part of the National Highway System since 1991.

US 25E has been included in the U.S. Highway System since the system's inception in 1926.

US 25E is concurrent with unsigned Tennessee State Route 32 for its entire length in Tennessee.

Route description

Tennessee

French Broad region 

US 25E begins in the western portion of the city of Newport in Cocke County where it forks at the northern terminus of US 25 alongside US 25W/US 70.
Northbound US 25 and westbound US 70 leave Newport concurrent with one another. From Newport, US 25E continues as two-lane primary highway out of unincorporated Cocke County through a forested area near the community of Gum Spring approaching the Douglas Lake impoundment of the French Broad River. After briefly paralleling the shoreline of the French Broad River, US 25E exits Cocke County as it crosses over the French Broad at the concrete bulb-tee beam J.M. Walters Bridge.

US 25E then enters Jefferson County northeast of the resort city of Baneberry, through a rural/residential corridor before entering the town limits of White Pine at SR 341 (Roy Messer Highway). In the town of White Pine, US 25E becomes State Street, the main roadway in the town providing access to the town's residential and commercial areas. Exiting White Pine, US 25E connects to the Walters State Great Smoky Mountains Expo Center approaching I-81 at the Jefferson-Hamblen county borderline.

Morristown-Bean Station region 

Entering Hamblen County, US 25E widens to a four-lane divided expressway at I-81 exit 8 and is designated Appalachian Development Corridor S. US 25E then enters the southern city limits of Morristown near the East Tennessee Progress Center industrial park. Northbound, US 25E becomes a freeway and meets Tennessee State Route 160 (Governor Dewitt Clinton Senter Highway), a southern bypass route of Morristown at a partial cloverleaf interchange. US 25E then enters the central business district of Morristown, first accessing Walters State Community College and College Square Mall at a Texas U-turn-based diamond interchange. US 25E meets US 11E (Morris Boulevard) at a partial cloverleaf interchange and shares short concurrency until meeting another partial cloverleaf interchange where US 11E splits, and heads eastbound as Andrew Johnson Highway. North of this interchange, US 25E downgrades to a limited-access four-lane highway as it approaches the Hamblen-Grainger county border at the Cherokee Lake impoundment of the Holston River. Before, exiting Morristown, US 25E has incomplete interchange with SR 343, a former alignment of US 25E. 

US 25E then crosses the Holston River at the steel stringer beam Olen R. Marshall Memorial Bridge. After this crossing, US 25E enters the town of Bean Station in Grainger County, passing by tourist-based commercial development before approaching the left-turn only-restricted junction of SR 375. North of SR 375, US 25E becomes a freeway, bypassing Bean Station, that meets US 11W at a trumpet interchange, beginning a short concurrency. US 25E-US 11W continues northwest, downgrading to an expressway through a minor commercial district.  west of Bean Station, near Briar Fork Creek, US 25E splits from US 11W at an interchange near the base of Clinch Mountain, with US 11W heading west along the Richland Valley towards Knoxville, and US 25E northbound through Poor Valley ascending the southern slope of Clinch Mountain.

Clinch Mountain-Cumberland Gap Region 

US 25E then ascends northbound towards Bean Gap on top of Clinch Mountain, providing access to a scenic overlook of the Clinch Mountain valley, and then descends down the northern slope of Clinch Mountain, where it meets SR 131 at a restricted-offset intersection in the community of Thorn Hill. North of Thorn Hill, US 25E traverses through the rugged forested Copper Ridge area before approaching the pre-stressed box girder Indian Creek bridge. After crossing Indian Creek, US 25E enters the Dry Valley region adjacent to the Clinch River. US 25E briefly parallels the Clinch River on its west side and Dry Valley rock bluff on its east before crossing the Clinch River at the Grainger-Claiborne county line via a multi-beam girder bridge.

Entering Claiborne County, US 25E winds through the forested and mountainous Caney Valley region and crosses Big Sycamore Creek on a stringer bridge. North of Big Sycamore Creek, US 25E has an intersection with eastbound SR 33, beginning a concurrency northbound towards the town of Tazewell. US 25E-SR 33 exits the Caney Valley region and enters the rural unincorporated community of Springdale. US 25E then enters the town limits of Tazewell near Wallen Ridge. In Tazewell's central business district, US 25E splits from SR 33, heading north and meets SR 345 at its eastern terminus. US 25E then exits the commercialized northern end of Tazewell and enters a rugged rural and forested corridor approaching the Powell River.

US 25E then enters the city limits of Harrogate after crossing the Powell River on a girder bridge. In Harrogate, US 25E traverses a rural-residential corridor before meeting eastbound SR 63, beginning a minor concurrency before meeting westbound SR 63 (Corridor F) at the corner of the campus of Lincoln Memorial University (LMU). US 25E is adjoined by LMU's campus on the west, and Harrogate's central business district on the east. Exiting Harrogate, US 25E enters the town limits of Cumberland Gap and upgrades to a freeway at the base of the Cumberland Mountains. It then encounters the western terminus US 58 via trumpet interchange and begins its approach to the Cumberland Gap Tunnel at the base of the Cumberland Gap. It crosses the Tennessee-Kentucky near the tunnel's midway point, and exits the tunnel and Tennessee as a four-lane freeway.

Kentucky

Cumberland Gap-Pine Mountain region 

Exiting the Cumberland Gap Tunnel and Tennessee, US 25E has a trumpet interchange with the entrance road for Cumberland Gap National Historical Park before heading west to the city of Middlesboro in Bell County, where it downgrades to a four-lane highway, and intersects KY 74. North of KY 74, US 25E continues through Middlesboro as the main commercial throughfare, providing access to Middlesboro Mall, and intersecting KY 441 before exiting northern Middlesboro's city limits. Between Middlesboro and the city of Pineville, US 25E travels through the Kentucky Ridge State Forest/Pine Mountain State Resort Park in the Pine Mountain ridge and accesses Bell County High School. Entering the city limits of Pineville, US 25E meets US 119 (Appalachian Corridor F). US 25E then becomes a horseshoe-shaped bypass of Pineville's central business district and intersects KY 66.

Barbourville-Cumberland River region 

Approaching the rural community of Flat Lick, US 25E crosses the Cumberland River twice, enters Knox County, and intersects KY 92. In Flat Lick, US 25E meets Kentucky Routes 930 and 223. US 25E then makes an S-shaped curve, dipping south then turning back northwest as it approaches the city of Barbourville, designed originally as a bypass. Instead, the route serves as the city's major commercial corridor, providing access to Union College, and meeting KY 225 and KY 11. US 25E then enters a rugged forested area in the Cumberland Plateau near the unincorporated community of Baileys Switch. Between Baileys Switch and Gray, US 25E gradually turns more east–west, and witnesses a transition from rugged forested land to rolling farmland.

Corbin-North Corbin region 
Departing the rural community of Gray, the route's corridor begins transitioning from a rural setting to a more exurban-developed land-use as it approaches the conurbation of Corbin-North Corbin, with more consecutive signalized intersections with increased commercial development. US 25E then enters the city limits of Corbin at the northern terminus of KY 3041 (Corbin Bypass). Extending further east into a commercialized area of Corbin, the route also meets the northern terminus of KY 312. Past KY 312, the route then enters Laurel County and the unincorporated yet intensely developed community of North Corbin. US 25E then reunites with US 25W, and the unsuffixed US 25 continues north towards London. However, the US 25E designation continues west to Interstate 75, where it ends at Exit 29. Overall, US 25E remains a multilane divided highway for its entire extent in Kentucky.

History

The route of US 25E was reportedly first traversed by Native Americans, long before the area was settled by European pioneers. During this period, the route was considered a part of the Cherokee Warriors' Path. Most notably, the Cumberland Gap to Bean Station section of the route was used as part to Kentucky on famous pioneer and settler, Daniel Boone's Wilderness Road, being used for early interstate travel through Appalachia. By 1821, the pathway of the Wilderness Road from the Cumberland Gap to Bean Station would be established as the Bean Station Turnpike, and would receive state funding while it being a privately owned toll route due to its importance for early interstate travel in the Appalachia region.

In 1915, the Bean Station Turnpike path of what would become US 25E, with an extension to Morristown in Tennessee, was designated a part of the Dixie Highway, one of the routes in the National Auto Trail system, one of the earliest highway systems developed in the United States.

Through-out the early to mid-20th century, the route from the Cumberland Gap to Tazewell, along with SR 33 from Tazewell to Knoxville, was part of the infamous Thunder Road, which was used by bootleggers to illegally transport and trade moonshine. The story was later fictionally adapted into a 1958 crime-drama film and song of the same name.

Before the Cumberland Gap Tunnel was opened in 1996, US 25E passed through the Cumberland Gap in Virginia. Prior to the U.S. highway system's arrival, Virginia's State Highway 10 began at the Cumberland Gap and proceeded to Bristol. A short spur south to Tennessee was soon added, becoming State Route 107 in the 1923 renumbering, and State Route 100 in the 1928 renumbering.

Early U.S. Highway planning assigned the number U.S. Route 411 to SR 10 through Cumberland Gap to Kentucky, and no number to SR 107. By the final 1926 plan, US 411 was truncated to Cumberland Gap, and US 25E ran from Tennessee to Kentucky along SR 10 and SR 107. The State Route numbers were dropped in the 1933 renumbering.

In 1965, the US 25E corridor from I-75 in North Corbin to I-81 in Morristown would be proposed as Corridor S of the ARC's Appalachian Development Highway System (ADHS). Kentucky officials would ask for the designation in Kentucky to be removed, with Corridor S only designated on US 25E in the state of Tennessee with the passing of the Appalachian Regional Act of 1965.

With the increased use of the corridor, many portions in urbanized areas would become deficient, leading to plans for its widening and relocation. Construction began in 1975 and completed in 1977. US 25E was widened into a four-lane bypass in the Morristown–Hamblen urban area from I-81 exit 8 to the Grainger County line at Cherokee Reservoir. Tennessee transportation personnel proposed plans in 1979 to rename US 25E to US 25, as US 25W had largely paralleled or was concurrent to the I-75 corridor. However, the plan was dismissed following dissent from Kentucky officials.

Through-out the 1970s to the 1990s, highway improvement projects conducted by a joint-effort between the Tennessee Department of Transportation (TDOT), the Federal Highway Administration (FHWA), and Appalachian Regional Commission (ARC), began to widen US 25E between the town of Cumberland Gap to Interstate 81 south of the city of Morristown into a limited-access and partial controlled-access highway. Transportation and engineering personnel in Kentucky would widen the route from I-75 to the city of Middlesboro in preparation of the Cumberland Gap tunnel project. In 1986, funding for the widening of US 25E into a four-lane limited-access highway from Bean Station to the Holston River Bridge at Morristown would be funded through then Governor Lamar Alexander's Bicentennial Parkway Trust Fund, which was supported through increased gas taxes.

With the signing of the Intermodal Surface Transportation Efficiency Act in 1991 by the United States Congress, the US 25E corridor from I-75 at Corbin to I-81 at Morristown was designated as High-Priority Corridor 12, making it as part of the National Highway System.

Before the completion of the Cumberland Gap Tunnel, US 25E saw increased congestion following an uptick in truck traffic bypassing I-75 through Campbell County and Knoxville. The route is considered an alternate corridor of I-75 attractive to commuters to regional metropolises such as Morristown and Corbin-North Corbin and truckers alike connecting to interstates 81 and 75, bypassing the congested stretch of I-75 in Knoxville and the stretch north of Knoxville through the Cumberland Mountains, which is prone to rockslides.

Since the 2000s, congestion from truck and commuter traffic, and the issue of access control has brought several projects in Tennessee and Kentucky on upgrading US 25E up to Interstate Highway standards. Kentucky transportation officials cited the route as a "travel corridor the Eastern Seaboard (via connection to Interstate 40 and Interstate 81 in Tennessee) for through traffic."

As of 2013,  has been completed of Corridor S along 25E, while  remains to be constructed, which consists of rest areas and design and construction of interchanges to meet Interstate Highway standards along the stretch of 25E labeled corridors F and S.

Cumberland Gap Tunnel project

In the mid-to-late-20th century, US 25E between Middlesboro and Cumberland Gap had seen an uptick in fatal collisions, with the stretch of highway through the Cumberland Gap nicknamed "Massacre Mountain." In 1973, officials with the National Park Service received initiatives to construct tunnels underneath the Cumberland Gap in order to resolve the accidents and restore the Cumberland Gap to its pioneer-era state of the 1770s, a motion set forth by the establishment of Cumberland Gap National Historical Park by the United States Congress in 1940. The plan, consisting of the construction of twin 4,600 foot long tunnels, five miles of new a four-lane controlled-access US 25E, two interchanges, seven bridges, and the restoration of the Cumberland Gap, was presented with a cost of $265 million dollars and was led by joint effort between the National Park Service and the Federal Highway Administration. Design work for the project started in 1979, and construction on the tunnels and the new four-lane 25E began in 1985.

The Cumberland Gap Tunnel would open in 1996, completely bypassing Cumberland Gap and Virginia. U.S. Route 58 was moved to a new alignment along a short stretch of old US 25E to meet the new four-lane 25E in Tennessee, decommissioning 25E entirely in Virginia. As the remainder of old US 25E through Virginia and Kentucky lay within the boundaries of the Cumberland Gap National Historical Park, its pavement was torn up and the path was restored into a hiking trail along the Wilderness Road through the Cumberland Gap.

Major intersections

See also

References

External links 

US 25 at KentuckyRoads.com
Kentucky Transportation Cabinet 
Tennessee Department of Transportation

25E
25E
25E
25E
E
Transportation in Bell County, Kentucky
Transportation in Knox County, Kentucky
Transportation in Laurel County, Kentucky
Transportation in Cocke County, Tennessee
Transportation in Jefferson County, Tennessee
Transportation in Hamblen County, Tennessee
Transportation in Grainger County, Tennessee
Transportation in Claiborne County, Tennessee
Expressways in the United States